Ganggangsullae (Hangul: 강강술래) is an ancient Korean dance that was first used to bring about a bountiful harvest and has developed into a cultural symbol for Korea. It incorporates singing, dancing, and playing and is exclusively performed by women. The dance is mostly performed in the southwestern coastal province of Jeollanam-do.  It is often associated with the Chuseok holiday and Daeboreum. They dance all night and continue to play folk games in circles. The performance starts with a late Ganggangsullae and changes to a 'Jajeun-Ganggangsullae', which are characterized by the most beautiful and feminine charms of late Ganggangsullae, and 'Jung-Ganggangsullae" only in the Haenam and Jindo provinces.

The dance was registered as the UNESCO's intangible cultural heritage from Korea in 2009.

Etymology 
The etymology of Ganggangsullae is not clear, however the term's origins can be guessed by interpreting the name in either indigenous Korean or Hanja characters. 

Some theorize that the term was derived from the indigenous Korean words, in which 'Gang' of Ganggangsullae means circle and 'sullae', which derived from the words 'sunu' or 'sulla', means a wagon or to alert. In combination, the term means to wagon or alert around in circle.

Others suggests that the word Ganggangsullae was a hanja phrase meaning "a powerful barbarian is going to invade our country", given it was a chant to make the public aware of enemy invaders.

History

Beginning 
The dance is thought to have originated in ancient times when the Koreans believed that the Sun, Moon, and Earth controlled the universe. Participants would dance under the brightest full moon of the year in order to bring about a good harvest. Ganggangsullae has been held in Korea's most famous festivals like New Year's Day, Daeboreum, Dano, and Chuseok, which was largest at Chuseok. So, Ganggangsullae has become a popular event on Chuseok. On the evening of Chuseok, dozens of young farming women dance with their hands held together, singing and dancing.

Feature of Korea's traditional society 
Korea's traditional society was a male-dominated society, and young women were not allowed to sing loudly or go out at night. But women were allowed to sing and dance by doing “ganggangsullae” at night and give vent to their frustration at Chuseok. Women could enjoy the atmosphere free from normal restrictions during the festival.

In the 16th century, during the Japanese invasion of Korea, Admiral Yi Sun-sin ordered women to do this dance in military uniform to intimidate the Japanese. The women were said to have dressed in military uniform and danced on Mount Okmae (옥매산). The Japanese scouts thus overestimated the strength of the Korean troops.

On February 15, 1966, ganggangsullae was designated as Important Intangible Cultural Properties of Korea #8.

How to Perform Ganggangsullae

Wonmu 
It is the main action of Ganggangsullae, which is spinning counterclockwise.

Holding hands and Walking 
When holding hands with each other, the back of the right hand should be above, and the palm of the left hand should be above. When walking, the heel should be on the ground first.

Running 
People doing 'running' have to run faster than 'walking'. They shouldn't open their legs very much, and they have to raise their knees while running.

Gatekeeper Play 
Except the first two-person, they make a line to be ready to go through the gate. The first and second person makes the gate, and then the right next person who went through the gate makes the gate, while the person who made the gate returns to the line.

Stomping Roof Tile 
Except three people, they stand in a line lowering their heads. One person stands on their waist and starts to walk on them. The other two people holds her hands not to fall down.

Regional aspect of Ganggangsullae 
Ganggangsullae is often handed down as a frame with Ganggangsullae, and is handed down independently, depending on the region. In this way, the patterns of existence of Ganggangsulrae vary depending on the area, and the meaning given to Ganggangsulla varies according to the region.

Function and Meaning of Ganggangsullae

Ritualistic Function 
On the full moon night, there is a meaning of praying for the abundance and praise of the moon Ganggangsullae. At present, the meaning of the proposal is not strong, but it is presumed that the origin and departure of Ganggangsullae originated from the merit. Ganggangsullae's offerings differ slightly depending on tradition. In other words, in the region considered to be the central part, the quality remains stronger than the peripheral part. For example, steels are not in the periphery. So there is no ceremonial process of going from the Jin Ganggang to the Kang Ganggang.

Function and meaning of the origin of affluence 
In the Shinan area, Ganggangsullae is said to have been performed not exclusively by women, but by men and women together. It can be said that Ganggangsullae is associated with courtship. It carries the meaning of praying to the moon for abundance.

Function and meaning of Kanggangsullae related to the Japanese Invasion 
The well - known Kanggangsullae 's theory of Imjinwaeran remains centered on Jindo and Haenam. During the Japanese invasion of Imjin, women changed their clothes and turned around Ganggangsullae.

Function and meaning as play song 
In the surrounding area, Ganggangsullae is played as a play song. Heroic weaving, the end of virtue, treadmill tilting, and the birth of a child were also made for educational purposes. It is a representative meaning of Ganggangsullae in the 21st century.

Function and meaning as cultural property 
Ganggangsullae is designated as the Intangible Cultural Property No. 8 of Korea. Now Ganggangsullae has become one of the performances. Ganggangsullae is a cultural asset that has a lot of music and power to pass down.

Characteristics

Traditionally, this dance is performed only by women at night without any instruments. Young and old women dance in a circle at night under the moonlight. They go outside in traditional Korean clothing, hold each other's hands, make a circle, and start rotating clockwise.  The lead singer sings a line and everyone sings the refrain 'ganggangsullae'.  The song tempo progressively becomes faster. They sing about their personal hardships, relationships, and desires. During the dance, the women play a variety of games. The dance can last until dawn.

See also
 Chuseok
 Maypole

References

External links

 Ganggangsullae

Circle dances
Korean dance
Intangible Cultural Heritage of Humanity
Important Intangible Cultural Properties of South Korea

simple:Insadong